Emerging Island is an ice-covered island  long, lying  east of Index Point, Victoria Land, Antarctica, in the northern part of Lady Newnes Bay. The feature appears to be barely emerging above the ice at the terminus of Mariner Glacier. It was named in 1966 by the New Zealand Antarctic Place-Names Committee.

See also 
 List of antarctic and sub-antarctic islands

References 

Islands of Victoria Land
Borchgrevink Coast